Saint-Christophe-du-Luat is a former commune in the Mayenne department in north-western France. On 1 January 2019, it was merged into the commune Évron.

See also 

 Communes of Mayenne

References 

Saintchristopheduluat